Horace Francis Barnes ( 23 November 1902 - 5 February 1960) was an English entomologist who specialised in Diptera.

From 1924 to 1927 he was a Ministry of Agriculture Research Scholar at The College of St Gregory and St Martin at Wye in England  and New York State Museum. From 1927 until his death he worked at Rothamsted Experimental Station.

Barnes specialised in Cecidomyiidae. He was also interested in Tipulidae.

His collection is held by the Natural History Museum, London.

Works
 Barnes, H.F. 1946a. Gall midges of economic importance. Vol. I: gall midges of root and vegetable crops. Crosby Lockwood & Son Ltd., London.

partial list
Barnes, H.F. 1946b. Gall midges of economic importance. Vol. II: gall midges of fodder crops. Crosby Lockwood & Son Ltd., London.
Barnes, H.F. 1948a. Gall midges of economic importance. Vol. III: gall midges of fruit. Crosby Lockwood & Son Ltd., London.
Barnes, H.F. 1948b. Gall midges of economic importance. Vol. IV: gall midges of ornamental plants and shrubs. Crosby Lockwood & Son Ltd., London.
Barnes, H.F. 1949. Gall midges of economic importance. Vol. VI: gall midges of miscellaneous crops. Crosby Lockwood & Son Ltd., London.
Barnes, H.F. 1951. Gall midges of economic importance. Vol. V: gall midges of trees. Crosby Lockwood & Son Ltd., London.
Barnes, H.F. 1956. Gall midges of economic importance. Vol. VII: gall midges of cereal crops. Crosby Lockwood & Son Ltd., London. 261 p.

References
Uvarov, B. P. 1961: [Barnes, H. F.]  Proc. R. Ent. Soc. London (C), London 25:50
Nijvelelt, W. 1960: [Barnes, H. F.]  Ent. Berichten, Amsterdam 20:157, Portrait	
Margaret K. Arnold Bibliography of H. F. Barnes . Journal of the Society for the Bibliography of Natural History. Volume 4, Page 35-43 DOI 10.3366/jsbnh.1962.4.1.35  ISSN 0260-9541

English entomologists
1960 deaths
Dipterists
1902 births
People educated at Bedford School
20th-century British zoologists
Alumni of Wye College